Joachim Dietmar Mues (1945–2011) was a German stage, film and television actor.

Filmography

References

Bibliography
 Charles P. Mitchell. The Hitler Filmography: Worldwide Feature Film and Television Miniseries Portrayals, 1940 through 2000. McFarland, 2002.

External links

1945 births
2011 deaths
German male film actors
German male television actors
People from Dresden